Bogdănești is a commune in Bacău County, Western Moldavia, Romania located on the Oituz River valley. It is composed of two villages, Bogdănești and Filipești.

Natives
 Nicolae Matei

References

Communes in Bacău County
Localities in Western Moldavia